Gatica is a surname. Notable people with the surname include:

Alfredo Gatica (born 1988), Mexican television actor
Bárbara Gatica (born 1996), Chilean tennis player
Humberto Gatica, Chilean-born American record producer, music mixer, and audio engineer
José María Gatica (1925–1963), Argentine boxer
Lucho Gatica (1928–2018), Chilean bolero singer, film actor, and television host
Luis Gatica (born 1961), Mexican actor
Malú Gatica (1922–1997), Chilean actress and singer
Rodolfina Gatica Garzón (born 1965), Mexican politician
Vicente Gatica (born 1996), Chilean footballer